Catholic Missions in Canada is a fundraising organization that supports poor missions in Canada. The movement was organized as an independent society, bearing the name of The Catholic Church Extension Society of Canada, by a group including Fergus Patrick McEvay, Archbishop of Toronto.

The society was formed on 23 September 1908, by Monsignor E. Alfred Burke from the Diocese of Charlottetown, Prince Edward Island. A papal brief was issued to the Church Extension Society in Canada on 9 June 1910, granting it papal approval and pontifical status. The Canadian society purchased the Catholic Register, a weekly paper, enlarged it, and turned it into its official organ.

In 1999 the name of the Society was changed to Catholic Missions In Canada.

References

External links
Catholic Missions in Canada

Catholic missions
Christian organizations established in 1908
Catholic Church in Canada
1908 establishments in Canada